The 1948 United States presidential election in Delaware took place on November 2, 1948, as part of the 1948 United States presidential election. State voters chose three representatives, or electors, to the Electoral College, who voted for president and vice president.

Delaware was won by Governor Thomas Dewey (R–New York), running with Governor Earl Warren, with 50.04% of the popular vote, against incumbent President Harry S. Truman (D–Missouri), running with Senator Alben W. Barkley, with 48.76% of the popular vote. This is the last time that New Castle county did not back the statewide winner, when the Democratic candidate would win a presidential election without Delaware, and the last election until 2000 when Delaware failed to support the overall winner of the presidency, and the electoral college. It has since voted for the popular vote loser only once, in 2004.

Results

See also
 United States presidential elections in Delaware

References

Delaware
1948
1948 Delaware elections